Jacqueline Smith may refer to:

Jacqui Smith (birth name Jacqueline Jill Smith; born 1962), British politician
Jacqueline Smith (trade unionist) (born 1971), Norwegian trade unionist
Jaclyn Smith (birth name Jacquelyn Ellen Smith; born 1945), actress

See also
Jackie Smith (disambiguation)